The BT Museum was a telecommunications museum run by BT, that held artefacts and exhibits on the history of telecommunications in the United Kingdom. It was based in Baynard House in the Blackfriars district of London.

It was originally opened as the Telecom Technology Showcase in 1982.

It was closed to visitors in 1997, and was replaced in 2001 by the Connected Earth initiative.

References

See also 

 BT Archives

BT Group
Defunct museums in London
1982 establishments in England
Museums disestablished in 1997
Telecommunications museums in the United Kingdom
Museums established in 1982
1997 disestablishments in England